The 1988–89 Yugoslav Second League season was the 43rd season of the Second Federal League, the second level association football competition of SFR Yugoslavia, since its establishment in 1946.

Teams
A total of twenty teams contested the league, including eight sides from the West and eight sides East Division from the 1987–88 season, two clubs relegated from the 1987–88 Yugoslav First League and two sides promoted from the Inter-Republic Leagues played in the 1987–88 season. The league was contested in a double round robin format, with each club playing every other club twice, for a total of 38 rounds. Two points were awarded for a win, while in case of a draw - penalty kicks were taken and the winner of the shootout was awarded one point while the loser got nothing. The 1988-89 season was the first to feature this tie-break system, and the Yugoslav FA's decision to implement this caused a lot of criticism and controversy. Apparently, the biggest proponent of the new system was FA president Slavko Šajber and the system was often derisively referred to in the media as 'Šajber's penalties'.

Prishtina and Sutjeska were relegated from the 1987–88 Yugoslav First League after finishing in the bottom two places of the league table. The two clubs promoted to the second level were Belasica and Bačka.

League table

See also
1988–89 Yugoslav First League
1988–89 Yugoslav Cup

References

Yugoslav Second League seasons
Yugo
2